Joaquim Miguel Matos Fernandes Duarte Silva (17 March 1924 – 16 June 2007) was a Portuguese equestrian. He competed at the 1952, 1956, 1960 and the 1964 Summer Olympics.

References

External links
 

1924 births
2007 deaths
Portuguese male equestrians
Olympic equestrians of Portugal
Equestrians at the 1952 Summer Olympics
Equestrians at the 1956 Summer Olympics
Equestrians at the 1960 Summer Olympics
Equestrians at the 1964 Summer Olympics
People from Évora
Sportspeople from Évora District